Wahlroos is a Finnish surname. Notable people with the surname include:

Björn Wahlroos  (born 1952), CEO of Sampo Group
Dora Wahlroos (1870–1947), Finnish painter
Drew Wahlroos (1980–2017), American football player

Finnish-language surnames